Seo Seung-jae (Hangul: 서승재; born 4 September 1997) is a South Korean badminton player. In 2014, he competed at the Summer Youth Olympics in Nanjing, China. In 2017, he helped the Korean national team compete at the 2017 Sudirman Cup and won the trophy and the gold medal at that tournament.

Career 
Seo competed at the 2020 Summer Olympics in the men's doubles partnered with Choi Sol-gyu and in the mixed doubles with Chae Yoo-jung. His pace was stopped in the group stage and quarter-finals respectively.

Achievements

Summer Universiade 
Men's doubles

BWF World Junior Championships 
Boys' doubles

Asian Junior Championships 
Boys' singles

BWF World Tour (8 titles, 11 runners-up) 
The BWF World Tour, which was announced on 19 March 2017 and implemented in 2018, is a series of elite badminton tournaments sanctioned by the Badminton World Federation (BWF). The BWF World Tour is divided into levels of World Tour Finals, Super 1000, Super 750, Super 500, Super 300, and the BWF Tour Super 100.

Men's doubles

Mixed doubles

BWF Grand Prix (4 titles, 3 runners-up) 
The BWF Grand Prix had two levels, the Grand Prix and Grand Prix Gold. It was a series of badminton tournaments sanctioned by the Badminton World Federation (BWF) and played between 2007 and 2017.

Men's doubles

Mixed doubles

  BWF Grand Prix Gold tournament
  BWF Grand Prix tournament

BWF International Challenge/Series (2 titles) 
Men's doubles

  BWF International Challenge tournament
  BWF International Series tournament

References

External links 

 

1997 births
Living people
People from Jeonju
Sportspeople from North Jeolla Province
South Korean male badminton players
Badminton players at the 2020 Summer Olympics
Olympic badminton players of South Korea
Badminton players at the 2014 Summer Youth Olympics
Badminton players at the 2018 Asian Games
Asian Games competitors for South Korea
Universiade gold medalists for South Korea
Universiade medalists in badminton
Medalists at the 2017 Summer Universiade